Benjamin Qi (also known as Benq and bqi343) is an American competitive programmer and the two-time winner of the International Olympiad in Informatics, the "most prestigious" high school competition for algorithmic programming, in 2018 and 2019. Qi is considered one of the top 10 competitive programmers in the world. In December 2019, Qi also became one of the lead problem setters for the USA Computing Olympiad. He is also the director for the USACO Guide, a leading website for studying for the USACO.

Early life 
Interested in both math and computer science from an early age, Qi was a quarterfinalist at the 2015 MATHCOUNTS, and an honorable mention at both the 2018 and 2019 USA Mathematical Olympiad. He completed his first USACO competition in December 2015. He attended Princeton High School from 2015 to 2019, and now attends the Massachusetts Institute of Technology.

Competitive programming

IOI 
Qi qualified for the USA's IOI time three times: in 2017, 2018, and 2019. Unable to attend the 2017 IOI, held in Iran, due to visa issues, he successfully attended the 2018 and 2019 IOIs, held in Tsukuba, Japan and Baku, Azerbaijan respectively. At the 2018 IOI, Qi scored 499 out of 600 points, 30 points more than second place Maolong Yang. He was the only contestant to fully solve the problems "Seats" and "Highway Tolls." At the 2019 IOI, which involved over 600 students from 88 countries, Qi scored 547.09 points ahead of second place Ildar Gainullin. Qi's two IOI wins made him only the fourth person to win multiple IOIs, and the first since Gennady Korotkevich in 2011.

USACO problem setter 
Following his high school graduation in 2019, Qi became one of the lead problem writers for the USACO contest. As of April 2021, he has contributed over two dozen problems to the contest.

Other competitions 
In June 2021, Qi achieved the highest rating of all time on Codeforces of 3797, breaking a 4-year record held by Gennady Korotkevich, although Korotkevich would subsequently reclaim the record a few months later. He finished 2nd place in the 2020 Facebook Hacker Cup. He finished 6th place in the 2020 Google Code Jam. He was a finalist at the 2020 Topcoder Open.

Qi also won a gold medal in the Romanian Master of Mathematics in 2019 and placed 2nd at the 2018 and 2019 February Harvard-MIT Math Tournaments.

ICPC 
Qi participated in ICPC 2021 held in Moscow. His team (MIT) ranked 9th place and won a bronze medal.

USACO Guide 
As part of his Competitive Programming Initiative, Qi created the USACO Guide in June 2020. Its stated purpose is to be a "comprehensive, organized roadmap carefully designed and crafted for USACO contestants – available to everyone, for free." On his GitHub account, Qi also has a repository with solutions to past USACO problems.

Publications 
In 2022, Qi published a research paper 'On Maximizing Sums of Non-monotone Submodular and Linear Functions'. Qi was supervised by Tasuku Soma as part of MIT's Undergraduate Research Opportunities Program.

See also 
 United States of America Computing Olympiad
 Codeforces
 International Olympiad in Informatics
 Gennady Korotkevich
 Petr Mitrichev

References 

Competitive programmers
Living people
2001 births
Massachusetts Institute of Technology alumni
Princeton High School (New Jersey) alumni